Peter Alan Blake (born April 6, 1957) is an American public administrator. Appointed Deputy Secretary of Education of Virginia by Governor Mark Warner in 2002, he was elevated to secretary upon Belle Wheelan's resignation in 2005. In 2012, he was appointed as Director of the State Council of Higher Education for Virginia after serving since April 2011 as interim director.

References

External links
 State Council of Higher Education for Virginia

Living people
1957 births
State cabinet secretaries of Virginia
Virginia Commonwealth University alumni